Frederick Pfarr Stamp Jr. (born July 24, 1934) is an inactive Senior United States district judge of the United States District Court for the Northern District of West Virginia.

Education and career

Born in Wheeling, West Virginia, Stamp received a Bachelor of Arts degree from Washington and Lee University in 1956, and attended the University of Virginia School of Law before receiving a Bachelor of Laws from the University of Richmond School of Law in 1959. He was a private in the United States Army from 1959 to 1960, and a First Lieutenant in the United States Army Reserves from 1960 to 1967. He was in private practice in Wheeling from 1960 to 1990.

Federal judicial service

On May 11, 1990, Stamp was nominated by President George H. W. Bush to a seat on the United States District Court for the Northern District of West Virginia vacated by William M. Kidd. Stamp was confirmed by the United States Senate on June 28, 1990, and received his commission on July 12, 1990. He served as Chief Judge from 1994 to 2001. He assumed senior status on November 1, 2006.

References

Sources

1934 births
Living people
Judges of the United States District Court for the Northern District of West Virginia
Lawyers from Wheeling, West Virginia
Military personnel from West Virginia
United States Army officers
United States Army reservists
United States district court judges appointed by George H. W. Bush
20th-century American judges
University of Virginia School of Law alumni
Washington and Lee University alumni
21st-century American judges